Chengqian is a town in Zoucheng, Jining, in southwestern Shandong province, China.

References

Township-level divisions of Shandong